Adegboyega "Bo" Oshoniyi (born November 3, 1971) is a retired American soccer goalkeeper who spent eight seasons in Major League Soccer. He is now the head men's soccer coach at Dartmouth College.

Career 
Oshoniyi's Nigerian father drowned when Bo was four years old. He played college soccer at Southern Connecticut State University, where he helped lead the team to Division II championships in 1990 and 1992. He finished his career at the school with a record of 67 wins, 8 losses, and 7 ties.

Professional

Columbus Crew
Upon the creation of MLS, Oshoniyi was selected in the fifth round of the 1996 MLS Inaugural Player Draft by the Columbus Crew. Oshoniyi had a notable assist in the first ever Crew home game on a long punt that found Brian McBride. Oshoniyi posted a 3-10 record. He started 13 games with the Crew, but was beaten out for the job by Brad Friedel, who was acquired in mid-season.  Oshoniyi was released by the Crew after 1996 along with 3rd string keeper Pat Harrington.

A-League / USL
In 1997 he played the next year with the Connecticut Wolves of the First Division. He moved to the Charleston Battery in 1998, and the Atlanta Silverbacks in 1999.

New England Revolution
Oshoniyi returned to MLS in 2000, when he was selected 39th overall in the MLS SuperDraft by the New England Revolution. He was traded by New England halfway through the preseason to the Kansas City Wizards for allocation money. He appeared in 1 preseason game for the Revolution, shutting out the Miami Fusion.

Kansas City Wizards
Oshoniyi played one game with the Kansas City Wizards, shutting out the San Jose Earthquakes while Meola was away with the National Team. It was Oshoniyi's first league game in 3 years. He was part of their MLS Cup-winning squad. An injury scare to Meola almost called Oshoniyi into duty early on in the 2000 season against the San Jose Earthquakes. In 2001 Oshoniyi was called into action for 11 games while Tony Meola was out injured posting a 4-5-1 record. He recorded 1 assist during the season. In 2002 while Meola was away with the National Team he again appeared in 13 games posting a 3-5-4 record on the year. 2003, he only appeared in 13 minutes of game action on the season when Meola picked up an injury. 2004 posted a career high 5-2-2 record after taking the starting job away from Tony Meola toward the end of the season, and was named the starting goalkeeper for the MLS Cup playoffs. He posted 5 shutouts in the final 9 games of the season going into the playoffs, recorded an assist in the final game of the season as well. He posted a 2-2 record in the playoffs, and was named the MLS Cup starting goalkeeper in a losing effort to D.C. United. Oshoniyi was named the starting goalkeeper going into the 2005 season, posting a career high 32 games, and an 11-9-12 record. He posted a career high in shutouts with 7, and finished 3rd in 2005 all star voting behind Pat Onstad and Matt Reis. In 2006 he had a 9-12-8 record. He enjoyed much success with the Wizards, posting a career total 36-43-27 record and 24 shutouts. Oshoniyi wasn't retained after the 2006 season when new head coach Curt Onalfo took over replacing him with Kevin Hartman. Oshoniyi was offered a trial with the Colorado Rapids and Houston Dynamo but declined the invitation electing to retire and move into the coaching full time.

Career statistics

As of August 22, 2006

Coaching record

References

External links
 Bo Oshoniyi's profile on MLSNet

1971 births
Living people
Association football goalkeepers
New York Centaurs players
Connecticut Wolves players
Charleston Battery players
Atlanta Silverbacks players
Columbus Crew players
Sporting Kansas City players
American sportspeople of Nigerian descent
Southern Connecticut Fighting Owls men's soccer players
African-American soccer players
Major League Soccer players
USL Second Division players
A-League (1995–2004) players
New England Revolution draft picks
East Tennessee State Buccaneers men's soccer coaches
Soccer players from Boston
American soccer players
American soccer coaches
21st-century African-American sportspeople
20th-century African-American sportspeople
Dartmouth Big Green men's soccer coaches